Gertrude Kathleen Shaw (18 January 1903 – 19 July 1983) was a British figure skater. She was born in Barton-upon-Irwell, Lancashire and was the 1926 World bronze medalist. She represented Great Britain at the 1924 Winter Olympics, where she placed 7th, and at the 1928 Winter Olympics, where she placed 14th. She won the inaugural British Figure Skating Championships in 1927.

Results

References

 
 

1903 births
1983 deaths
British female single skaters
English female single skaters
Sportspeople from Salford
Olympic figure skaters of Great Britain
Figure skaters at the 1924 Winter Olympics
Figure skaters at the 1928 Winter Olympics
World Figure Skating Championships medalists